The Shire of Ipswich is a former local government area in the south-east of Queensland, Australia.

History

The Greater Ipswich Scheme

On 13 October 1916, a rationalisation of the local government areas in and around Ipswich was implemented. It involved the abolition of five shires:
 Brassall
 Bundanba
 Lowood
 Purga
 Walloon
resulting in:
 a new Shire of Ipswich by amalgamating part of the Shire of Brassall, part of the Shire of Bundanba, part of the Shire of Walloon and all of the Shire of Purga
 an enlarged Shire of Rosewood by including part of the Shire of Walloon
 an enlarged City of Ipswich by including part of the Shire of Brassall and part of the Shire of Bundanba
 an enlarged Shire of Esk by including all of the Shire of Lowood

Renamed
One 28 July 1917, the Shire of Ipswich was renamed the Shire of Moreton.

References

Former local government areas of Queensland
1916 establishments in Australia